Hamdard Public School situated in Sangam Vihar is a co-educational, senior secondary school in New Delhi, India, affiliated to the Central Board of Secondary Education. It is recognized by the Department of Education, Govt. of NCT Delhi and the Ministry of HRD, Govt. of India. It has received the International School Award by British Council. It is also a member of the National Progressive Schools' Conference (NPSC).

It is one of the few schools across India to have the Atal Tinkering Lab, which aims to foster curiosity, creativity and imagination in young minds.

History
The school was founded in 1993 by Hakim Abdul Hameed, a Padma Bhushan and Padma Shri awardee and Saiyid Hamid who was a member of Indian Administrative Service and also served as the Vice Chancellor of Aligarh Muslim University. It is a Senior Secondary School preparing students for both All India Secondary School Examination and All India Senior School Certificate Examination. In class 11 and 12, students have to choose one of 5 streams: Non-Medical, Medical, Commerce with Maths, Commerce without Maths or Humanities. The school is run by the Hamdard Education Society, whose secretary is Syed Samar Hamid.

It is recognized as a minority school.

Alumni

Arts and entertainment
 Wasim Mushtaq (2003), TV actor

Sports
 Aamir Akhtar (1999), Former Nepali cricketer, Founder Everest Premier League (EPL)

See also 

 Hamdard Public College
 Hamdard University Bangladesh
 Hamdard University Karachi 
 Jamia Hamdard

References 

Educational institutions established in 1993
Schools in Delhi
CBSE Delhi
1993 establishments in Delhi